The Terminus De Montarville was inaugurated November 20, 2007 by the former Agence métropolitaine de transport (AMT) & the city of Boucherville.

The bus terminus was built on the corner of Quebec route 132 and Boulevard De Montarville. It includes a 308 car and 35 bicycle capacity parking and seven waiting areas for buses on two bus platforms.

It was built to help transfers between Boucherville's RTL bus lines 61, 80 and 85, and CIT Sorel-Varennes bus lines 700, 720, 721 and 722 on April 7, 2008.

These buses link to Longueuil terminus and Radisson station.

On June 1, 2017, the AMT was dissolved and replaced by two new governing bodies: the Autorité régionale de transport métropolitain (ARTM) and the Réseau de transport métropolitain (RTM). The RTM took over all former AMT services, including the operation of the station.

Connecting bus routes

Réseau de transport de Longueuil

Intermunicipal buses

De Mortagne Park-n-Ride

See also 
 ARTM park and ride lots

References

External links
Official RTM website
Réseau de transport de Longueuil (RTL)

Exo bus stations
Transport in Boucherville
Buildings and structures in Montérégie